Douglas Blair Lucek, better known as Doug Blair (born February 11, 1963) is a heavy metal guitarist and member of W.A.S.P. Blair's early development as a musician took place in his home state of Connecticut. His focus on technical ability with the guitar quickly saw him gaining a reputation locally in the Tri-State area of (NY, NJ, CT).

Music career

His early band, Run 21, played small club dates in the Tri-State area (NY, NJ, CT) and recorded some original material during that time. One of the songs, "Baby It's Your Face" was recorded at Presence Studios in Weston, Connecticut and released on the Metalstorm compilation produced by Jamie Bircumshaw and Tom Boyd in 1985. This early Doug Blair band, Run 21 also included Stet Howland on drums who would later join W.A.S.P., as would Blair. Run 21 was especially known for its outlandish show (compared to other Connecticut acts) that would see Blair jumping up on the bar and playing while running in between glasses and bottles. The act had an element of comedy with drummer Stet Howland's dialogue with the audience. This early "over the top" style of performance were precursors to what Blair and Howland would be doing with the internationally known W.A.S.P.

He initially played in W.A.S.P. for a short time in 1992. During this time Blair authored a guitar column for Mixx Magazine where he gave instruction and advice on the general subject of guitar playing and guitar instruments which he was known to design. He was also a quick replacement during W.A.S.P.'s Unholy Terror Tour in 2001 on two festival gigs when Chris Holmes left the band. In 2006 he was hired by W.A.S.P. for the third time.

His other current band is Signal2Noise with percussionist/vocalist John Anthony. Their debut album, Fighting Mental Illness, has seven songs: "Generica", "Contrast", "Hear", "Disown", "Out", "Corner" and a bonus acoustic version of "Wall".

From time to time, he also appears as a guest musician at gigs of other artists such as Barbe-Q-Barbies.

In May 2016 Blair announced an upcoming collaboration with American alternative metal vocalist and musician Melissa VanFleet. In October 2017, VanFleet released "Raven," a single featuring Blair on lead guitar.

Music Instrument Inventions

Blair is known for inventing the innovative instrument "GuitarCross" which blend five guitar strings with three bass strings (guitar strings sent to one amplifier, bass strings to another) to make a unique sound. He uses this invention in s2n and also uses a unique 12-string acoustic named "Asia."

Discography

W.A.S.P.
Dominator (2007)
Babylon (2009)
Golgotha (2015)
Re-Idolized (2018)

Other work
Dreams in the Witch House - A Lovecraftian Rock Opera (2013)
"Raven" - Melissa VanFleet (2017)

References

External links
Doug Blair, Interview: "Fighting Mental Illness" February 23, 2013
Official Doug Blair Home Page
Blair's Blade II Guitar
 Signal2Noise

1963 births
Living people
American heavy metal guitarists
American male guitarists
20th-century American guitarists
20th-century American male musicians